Stanley Hayer (born July 19, 1973 in Edmonton, Alberta) is a Canadian freestyle skier of Czech descent who currently resides in Kimberley, British Columbia. Stanley Hayer is a member of the Canadian national ski cross team.

Hayer moved over to the Czech Republic to ski with their team in the early part of the 2000s after disagreements with the Canadian National program. He would win a silver in the Czech nationals and go on to win a silver in the 2007 FIS World Championships. Hayer went back to the Canadian ski cross team for the start of the 2007-08 season with the 2010 Winter Olympics taking place in Canada.

Hayer won the gold medal at the 2009 Winter X-Games having won silver at the 2008 X-Games the year before.

Hayer was a member of the Canadian team going to the 2010 Winter Olympics in Vancouver. He was 10th in qualification and advanced to the elimination round. He finished second in his heat in the 1/8 round, and continued to the quarterfinals, where he finished last in his heat and was eliminated.

Hayer became the head coach of the Canadian ski cross team in 2015.  In 2019, Hayer won a Petro-Canada Coaching Excellence Award.

References

External links
 National Team Profile
 CTV Olympic Profile
 FIS Profile

Canadian male freestyle skiers
Freestyle skiers at the 2010 Winter Olympics
Olympic freestyle skiers of Canada
Czech male alpine skiers
Canadian male alpine skiers
Alpine skiers at the 2002 Winter Olympics
Olympic alpine skiers of the Czech Republic
Canadian people of Czech descent
1973 births
Living people
X Games athletes
Czech male freestyle skiers